Skylar John Thompson (born June 4, 1997) is an American football quarterback for the Miami Dolphins of the National Football League (NFL). He played college football at Kansas State and was drafted by the Dolphins in the seventh round of the 2022 NFL Draft.

Early life
Thompson was born to Brad Thompson and Teresa Thompson in Palmyra, Missouri on June 4, 1997. His mother Teresa was diagnosed with stage-four breast cancer and passed away in 2004 when Thompson was just six years old. Thompson also lost his grandfather, John Thompson, in 2003 to pancreatic cancer.

Thompson was a four-year letterer and starting quarterback, punter, and kicker at Fort Osage High School in Independence, Missouri. As a senior, Thompson threw for 2,129 yards on 142 passes with 26 touchdowns on only 3 interceptions, leading the Fort Osage Indians to a 13-1 record and a state championship title over Chaminade High School. In the state championship game alone, Thompson threw for a Missouri state record of 455 yards and 7 touchdowns. In his total career, Thompson threw for 6,222 yards on 423 passes (a 63% completion rate) with 72 touchdowns on just 9 interceptions.

Thompson was named a 3-star recruit by EPSN and a 4-star recruit by 247Sports, accepting a full-ride scholarship to Kansas State over offers from Illinois, Iowa State, Kansas, Louisville, North Dakota State, Ohio, Tulsa, UNLV, Wake Forest, and Wyoming, as well as several preferred walk-on spots, including Arkansas, Oklahoma, and Missouri, among many others.

Thompson also lettered in basketball, baseball, and soccer, and was named all-Missouri in both basketball and soccer at certain points in his career.

College career
After redshirting as a freshman and being named Scout Team Player of the Year, Skylar Thompson appeared in eight games and had four starts, throwing three touchdowns on 267 yards. He was named the full-time starter as a sophomore and kept that starting role until graduation, but was constantly plagued with injuries throughout college. His sophomore year was riddled with minor injuries, including a broken rib and a twisted ankle, and in 2020, Thompson was ruled out-for-season after sustaining a serious upper-body injury against Texas Tech that required "immediate surgery". Thompson was again injured in week 3 of 2021 against Southern Illinois, seeing limited time as a backup while healing and not returning full-time until week 10.

When Skylar was healthy, he played very well and has since been considered one of the best quarterbacks in the history of Kansas State football, having the all-time record for best passer rating over 2,000 yards, the second-most career passing touchdowns and passing yards in school history, as well as the second-most total offensive yards for a quarterback in school history. He finished his passing career with 7,134 yards on 552 passes (a 63% completion rate) for 42 touchdowns and 16 interceptions.  Skylar was also an effective running QB with 1087 total rushing yards and 26 TD.

College statistics

Professional career

Prior to the NFL draft, Thompson was predicted to be an undrafted free agent due to a history of injuries, his age, and a "lack of consistent production as a passer," according to NFL.com. Thompson was drafted by the Miami Dolphins, with the 247th overall pick in the seventh round of the 2022 NFL Draft.

2022 season 
Thompson's performance during the first two games of the 2022 preseason was notable, with ProFootballTalk speculating that his success might force the Dolphins to keep Thompson on the active roster rather than risk losing him to another team. Dolphins head coach Mike McDaniel also noted that it would be difficult to leave Thompson off of the main roster in light of his strong preseason performances. Thompson ranked first among qualifying quarterbacks in passer rating (138.5) at the conclusion of the 2022 preseason. Thompson was named to the 53 man roster after final cuts. 

Thompson made his NFL debut in Week 5 against the New York Jets after Teddy Bridgewater left the game with a concussion. He completed 19-of-33 passes for 166 yards and an interception in the 40–17 loss.

On October 15, 2022, Thompson was announced as the Dolphins Week 6 starter against the Minnesota Vikings after both Tua Tagovailoa and Teddy Bridgewater were dealing with concussions. He sustained a thumb injury after completing 7-of-13 passes for 89 yards and was replaced by Bridgewater, who cleared concussion protocol and was active as the backup quarterback.

On January 6, 2023, Thompson was announced as the starter against the New York Jets in Week 18 after Tagovailoa entered concussion protocol following Week 16 and Bridgewater suffered a dislocated finger on his throwing hand in Week 17. He completed 20 passes on 31 attempts for 152 yards in an 11-6 win for the Dolphins, clinching the team's first postseason appearance since the 2016 season. 

On January 11, Tagovailoa was officially ruled out for the Dolphins' Wild Card game against the Buffalo Bills, with coach Mike McDaniel stating that Thompson was in line to start his third career game. Two days later, Thompson was confirmed to be Miami's starter for the playoff game. Miami entered the contest as 14 point underdogs and were defeated 34-31. Thompson threw for 220 yards, a touchdown and 2 interceptions with a 40% completion rate, though Miami's receivers were credited with several drops.

NFL career statistics

Regular season

Postseason

References

External links
 
Miami Dolphins bio
Kansas State Wildcats bio

1997 births
Living people
American football quarterbacks
Kansas State Wildcats football players
Miami Dolphins players
People from Marion County, Missouri
Players of American football from Missouri
Sportspeople from Independence, Missouri